Tennessee's 9th congressional district is a congressional district in West Tennessee. It has been represented by Democrat Steve Cohen since 2007. With a Cook PVI of D+22, it is the only Democratic district in Tennessee.

The district was re-created as a result of the redistricting cycle after the 1980 Census.

Current boundaries
Beginning in 2023, The district is located within Tipton County, and Shelby County, where the city of Memphis is located.

It begins north on the border with Lauderdale County and encompasses some of Covington. 
It then travels south to the district's anchor city of Memphis. Nearly all of Memphis is in the 9th, although some of its city limits spill over into the 8th. 
The district then juts out east to capture Cordova, but mostly avoids Bartlett and Germantown.

The district is bounded on the west and south by Arkansas and Mississippi respectively.

Characteristics
The district is almost exclusively urban, due to its mostly cohabitant nature with Memphis.

Memphis is recognized worldwide for being the hub for FedEx. Largely due to FedEx's presence, Memphis International Airport boasts handles more cargo than any other airport in the country. Memphis is also known for blues music, Beale Street, and barbecue.

It is the only majority minority congressional district in Tennessee.

Politically speaking, the 9th is the most Democratic-leaning district in Tennessee. Since 1875, the area has sent mostly Democrats to Congress with the exception of a brief period from 1967 to 1974 when it was represented by Republican Dan Kuykendall.

Election results from presidential races 
Results Under Old Lines (2013-2023)

History
Arguably, the district's current characteristics began to take shape in 1925- the first year a congressional district consisted exclusively of Shelby County. 

A congressional district was perfectly coextensive with Shelby County from 1925 until 1966, when the Supreme Court case Baker v. Carr took effect. In that ruling, the court laid out a "one man, one vote" standard. Prior to 1966, the 9th was nearly ten times larger in population than the nearby 7th and 8th.

1967 was the first year where the district was merely a fraction of Shelby County rather than the county's entirety. In that election, the district chose former US Senate Republican nominee Dan Kuykendall.

In 1974, in the midst of Watergate, Kuykendall supported Nixon throughout the scandal. He was subsequently defeated in election by Democrat Harold Ford Sr., whose family had strong political ties in Memphis dating back to at least the 1920s. 

The district has swung Democrat in every congressional race since 1974.

Ford served in Congress for 22 years, when he was replaced by his son - Harold Ford Jr. - in 1997.
The younger Ford served for ten years, until he mounted an unsuccessful bid for US Senate.

Concurrent to Ford's senate bid, the district chose state senator Steve Cohen over Ford's brother Jake. Cohen is noted for being Tennessee's first Jewish congressman. Cohen has been elected seven times for a little over fourteen years in Congress.

List of members representing the district

Recent election results

2012

2014

2016

2018

2020

2022

Historical district boundaries

See also

Tennessee's congressional districts
List of United States congressional districts

References

 Congressional Biographical Directory of the United States 1774–present

09